The Odisha Disaster Rapid Action Force (ODRAF) is a specialised unit of Odisha Police constituted "To act immediately in case of disaster which may be due to natural calamity or industrial accident" by a state home department resolution.

Composition 
Odisha Disaster Rapid Action Force (ODRAF) is a force of 10 units. The manpower is derived from Odisha State Armed Police(OSAP) and Armed police Reserve(APR). They have been equipped with the necessary equipments such as cranes, generators, troop carriers, trucks, concrete cutting equipments etc. The ODRAF units can additionally use the requisite tools available with Govt. / Public Sector and private agencies for their operations.

Deployment 

These ODRAF units are located at twenty locations in the state based to cut down the response time for their deployment. These locations were chosen according to their vulnerability profile.

Functional parameters 
The aim of the ODRAF is to immediately respond to disaster which may be either due to natural calamity or industrial accidents. The units are trained in relevant response techniques and to act immediately . The forces are deployed on intimation of a disaster or warning of forthcoming disaster. The units mobilise at the request of Special Relief Commissioner/Orissa State Disaster Mitigation Authority (OSDMA)/ District Collector . Once deployed they remain under the command of the Superintendent of police of that district.

Disaster response 

ODRAF has proved its usefulness with its commendable performance during various disasters including the boat capsizing, devastating floods and Cyclones. Some of the major response operations of NDRF as below:

2005
 Flood in Bhadrak and Jajpur districts, Odisha –  3–5 July 2005 –

2009
 Coromandel Express derailment.
 Odisha Floods – Oct 2009 - Relief and rescue .

2011
 Flood in Jajpur district, Odisha –  Sep 2011 –

2013

 Cyclone Phailin - Post cyclone relief and rescue operation.

2014

 Hirakud Boat Capsizing incident - Feb 2014 .
 Flood in coastal districts,
 Cyclone Hudhud - Post cyclone relief and restoration

2015

 Flood in Odisha, August - relief and rescue operation

2016

 Deogarh Bus accident relief and rescue operation
 Bhubaneswar SUM hospital fire - Coordination of patient movement
 Chilika Boat capsize Incident - Rescue operation

2019

 Cyclone Fani relief and rescue.

2020

 Cyclone Amphan relief and rescue

2021

Elephant rescue incident
On 24 September 2021, an Odisha TV journalist died while another was critically injured when the boat they were travelling to cover the elephant rescue overturned due to the river current. An ODRAF personnel also died in the incident. The elephant rescue operation was put on hold after the boat overturned. The elephant was eventually found dead after he unable to cross the river.

Training 
The ODRAF personnel have undergone training on rescue equipment operations and maintenance. In addition they have been trained ate following specialised training.

 Flood Relief & Rescue Operation Training at Mukam Ghat, CRPF Training Centre, Bihar.
 Under Water Diving Course and Salvage Operation at S.E.I., Kolkata
 Basic Mountaineering Course at A.B.V.I., Monali, Himachal Pradesh.
 T.O.T. on Disaster Management at C.I.S.F., NISA, Hyderabad.
 Disaster Management Training at N.C.D.C., Nagpur.
 T.O.T. Course on M.F. & C.S.S.R. at CRPF Training Centre, Coimbatore, Tamil Nadu.
 Flood Rescue Course at N.D.R.F., Bn., Mundali, Cuttack.
 Rescue & Relief Operation at I.N.S., Chilika

See also 
 Odisha Police
National Disaster Response Force
 State Disaster Response Force, Assam

References

External links 

 Official website. https://odishapolice.gov.in/?q=node/208

Emergency management in India
Disaster Response Forces in India